Black Stone is a 2015 South Korean—French film about a young South Korean army recruit who deserts the military after facing sexual abuse. It stars the South Korean actor Won Tae-hee, who is shown in brief full-frontal nudity.

Plot
Black Stone tells the story of a deserting army recruit who returns to his parents' home in Seoul, where they worked in a food processing factory, to find they have disappeared. Intent on discovering where they have gone, he enters the jungle where his father was born, and finds it to be contaminated. The film is the last part of a trilogy about environmental pollution,  inspired by the French film director Robert Bresson and the Thai film director Apichatpong Weerasethakul.

See also
 List of South Korean films of 2015
 Nudity in film (East Asian cinema since 1929)

References

External links
 

2010s psychological drama films
Films set in Seoul
Films set in South Korea
Films shot in Seoul
Gay-related films
2015 LGBT-related films
South Korean psychological drama films
2010s Korean-language films
South Korean LGBT-related films
2010s South Korean films